Hans Sturm (3 September 1935 – 24 June 2007) was a German football player. He was born in Schönau an der Katzbach, Lower Silesia and died in Cologne.

The goalscoring inside right midfielder, who won the first Bundesliga trophy with 1. FC Köln in 1964, played just one of his three internationals for West Germany outside a FIFA World Cup. Therefore, he was part at the 1958 FIFA World Cup and at the 1962 FIFA World Cup, playing one match on each occasion.

With 1. FC Köln, Sturm also won the West German football championship in 1962.

His son Ralf (born 18 October 1968) was a striker for 1. FC Köln in the Bundesliga himself, netting 28 goals in 121 games as a striker in between 1988 and 1994.

References

1935 births
2007 deaths
People from Złotoryja County
Sportspeople from Lower Silesian Voivodeship
German footballers
Germany international footballers
1. FC Köln players
FC Viktoria Köln players
Bundesliga players
1958 FIFA World Cup players
1962 FIFA World Cup players
Association football midfielders